Avro was a British aircraft manufacturer from 1910 to 1963.

Avro or AVRO  may also refer to:

Companies and organisations
 Avro Canada, a Canadian aircraft manufacturer
 Avro International Aerospace, a British aircraft manufacturer from 1993 to 1998
 Algemene Vereniging Radio Omroep, a Dutch public-service broadcasting organisation
 Avro Energy, a defunct energy supplier in the United Kingdom, absorbed by Octopus Energy Group
 Avro F.C., a non-league football club in Oldham, England

Computing
 Apache Avro, a remote procedure call and data serialization framework
 Avro Keyboard, a Bengali typing software / keyboard layout changer

Other uses
 AVRO 1938 chess tournament
 Avro Manhattan (1914–1990), writer critical of the Catholic Church

See also
 Euro, a currency